The Isère is a river in the Auvergne-Rhône-Alpes region of southeastern France. Its source, a glacier known as the Sources de l'Isère, lies in the Vanoise National Park in the Graian Alps of Savoie, near the ski resort in Val-d'Isère on the border with Italy. An important left-bank tributary of the Rhône, the Isère merges with it a few kilometers north of Valence.

Many riverside communes have incorporated the Isère's name into their own, for example, Sainte-Hélène-sur-Isère and Romans-sur-Isère. The department of Isère is likewise named after the river.

Etymology 
The name Isère was first recorded under the form Isara, which means "the impetuous one, the swift one." Not originally a Celtic word, it was very likely assimilated by the Celts in ancient times. This word is related to the Indo-European *isərós, meaning "impetuous, quick, vigorous," which is similar to the Sanskrit isiráḥ इसिरः อิสิระ with the same definition. It was probably based on the reconstructed Indo-European root *eis(ə) (and not *is), which incidentally has not been found in the Celtic languages of the British Isles.

The word Isara figures in the etymology of many other river names, from ancient Gaul and its neighboring lands. Examples of this are the Ésera in Spain, the Isar in Germany, the small Franco-Belgian Yser, or even the ancient name of the Oise, Isara (the French adjective isarien still exists in the language and continues to describe anything related to the Oise). In non-Celtic countries, we find the Isarco, a river in Northern Italy, the Éisra and Istrà in Lithuania, Jizera in the Czech Republic and Usora in Bosnia and Herzegovina.

Geography 
The Isère's course measures  and runs through a wide variety of landscapes: from its source near the Italian border in the western Alps, it crosses the Pays de Savoie and the Tarentaise Valley, cuts between the Chartreuse and Belledonne mountain ranges, follows the Vercors Massif, passes through the Dauphiné province, and finally meets with the Rhône at the foot of the Vivarais.

Valleys 

The upper valley of the Isère is called the Tarentaise, and its middle valley the Grésivaudan.

Instead of widening its banks over time, the Isère has dug deeper into its bed, forming stepped fluvial terraces. The valley has clearly defined borders and is relatively narrow, not exceeding  in breadth.

The repetition of alluvial deposition (during periods of Quaternary glaciation) and overdeepening (during interglacial periods), known as a fluvioglacial system, led to the formation of several stepped terraces in the lower Isère valley, like the one on which Saint-Marcel-lès-Valence is built. This occurred through the massive accumulation of alluvium from the Isère on top of a bed of Miocene molasse. Today, these terraces still define the geography of the Plain of Valence.

Confluence 

The Isère initially merges with one of the Rhône's diversion canals, built for navigational purposes, at Pont-de-l'Isère. At the southern tip of La Roche-de-Glun (a commune on an island formed by the canal), the Isère Dam drains part of the water back into the Rhône and permits the Isère to continue its course alone until it passes through the Bourg-lès-Valence Dam and reaches its final junction with the Rhône.

Main Tributaries 
(L) Left-bank tributary; (R) Right-bank tributary.
 (L) , 
 (R) Doron de Champagny, 
 (L) , 
 (L) , 
 (R) Arly, 
 (L) Chaise, 
 (L) , 
 (L) Arc, 
 (L) Drac, 
 (R) , 
 (L) , 
 (R) , 
 (L) , 
 (R) Romanche, 
 (L) , 
 (R) , 
 (R) Morge, 
 (L) , 
 (L) , 
 (R) ,

Cities on the Isère 
 Savoie: Val-d'Isère, Bourg-Saint-Maurice, Aime, Moûtiers, Albertville, Montmélian
 Isère: Pontcharra, Grenoble, Voreppe
 Drôme: Romans-sur-Isère, Pont-de-l'Isère, La Roche-de-Glun

Hydrology 

The vertical profile of the river is made up of several zones:
 From its sources to Sainte-Foy-Tarentaise (except for those sources having a slope of around 25%), the average slope of the Isère is 5.1%, in a more or less confined valley (forests, gorges, and higher up, grasslands).
 As far as Moûtiers, the slope measures 1.18%.
 Before the river's confluence with the Arly, its slope is only 0.53%.
 The slope decreases to 0.136% until Grenoble.
 Downstream from Grenoble, it measures 0.1%.

The flow of the Isère was observed over a period of 58 years (between 1956 and 2015) at Beaumont-Monteux in the Drôme department, situated near the river's confluence with the Rhône. The discharge of the river at Beaumont-Monteux measured .

Generally speaking, this makes the Isère a very plentiful watercourse throughout the year.

However, the  can drop to  during a five-year dry spell, which is very low.

On the other hand, severe flooding can result from rapid thaw or torrential autumn rain.

The depth of runoff for the Isère's drainage basin is  annually, which is quite high above France's average and clearly superior to that of the Rhône's drainage basin ( in Valence for a surface area of ). The specific discharge is 27.9 liters per second per square kilometer of drainage basin.

Gallery

See also 
 List of rivers of France

References

External links 

Rivers of France
 
Rivers of Drôme
Rivers of Isère
Rivers of Savoie
Rivers of Auvergne-Rhône-Alpes
Rivers of the Alps